Gabriel Segal (born May 17, 2001) is an American professional soccer player who plays for Major League Soccer club New York City FC.

Early career
Segal played as a youth at Bethesda Soccer Club in Bethesda, Maryland, his hometown.

Career

Early years
Segal made his professional debut playing for Loudoun United of the USL Championship on June 28, 2019, against Atlanta United 2. Shortly afterwards Segal enrolled at Stanford University. At Stanford Segal won a Pac-12 championship playing for the Stanford Cardinal men's soccer team. He was an All-Pac-12 selection during the 2020–2021 season.

Köln
In the summer of 2022 Segal moved to Germany and signed for 1. FC Köln after playing for three years at Stanford University. He signed a two-year contact with the club.
Playing for Köln II in the Regionalliga West in the 2022–23 season he played 12 games, including six starts. He had his first goal involvement on October 1, 2022, in a 3–2 win against Wattenscheid.

New York
In January 2023 Segal was revealed to be signing with Major League Soccer club New York City FC. As a former collegiate player NYCFC had to claim Segal through waivers.

International career
Segal has represented the United States at under-14 and under-16 levels.  He was part of the under-18 side which were champions of the Václav Ježek Tournament held in Lázně Bělohrad, Czech Republic in August 2018.

References

External links

Living people
2001 births
Stanford Cardinal men's soccer players
1. FC Köln II players
American soccer players
United States men's youth international soccer players
American expatriate soccer players in Germany
American expatriate soccer players
USL Championship players